The Wellington Museum in Waterloo, Belgium, is located in the house where the Duke of Wellington, spent the night before and after the Battle of Waterloo (18 June 1815).

The museum contains information about the Duke of Wellington, the Waterloo Campaign, the main phases of the Battle of Waterloo a Gallery and contemporary military artefacts from the armies that fought in the battle.


Gallery

See also
List of Waterloo Battlefield locations

References

External links
 

Buildings and structures in Walloon Brabant
Museums in Walloon Brabant
Waterloo Battlefield locations
Waterloo, Belgium